Piaski is a neighbourhood, and an area of the Municipal Information System, in the city of Warsaw, Poland, located within the district of Bielany.

Characteristics 
Piaski is a residential neighbourhood, mostly consisting of the apartment buildings.

The Municipal Information System defines borders of Piaski as, Armii Krajowej Avenue to the east, Stanisława Maczka Street to the south, Władysława Broniewskiego Street to the north, and the Władysława Reymonta Street to the west.

History 
The area of modern Piaski used to be covered by sandy dunes, and remained mostly underdeveloped until 1970s.

The year 1888 marks the first known mention of the village of Młociny B (possibly an abacination to Młociny Burakowskie), located within modern area of Piaski. It was located near the village of Buraków (now part of the town of Łomianki). In 1892, the barracks of the Imperial Russian Army had been build in the area. The complex consisted of around 120 wooden and brick buildings. It also the included military training area.

On 8 April 1916, the area was incorporated into the city of Warsaw. After the year 1918, Młociny B had been renamed to Piaski. The name translates in Polish to sands and was a reference to the characteristic to the area sandy dunes.

Following the declaration of independence by the Second Polish Republic, the barracks and the surrounding military infrastructure begun being used by the Polish Armed Forces. In the 1930s in the area was also placed the railway training centre, to train railway workers. Some historians suspect, that the training centre was a cover for the secret operations of the Second Department of Polish General Staff, an intelligence agency of Polish Armed Forces.

During the Second World War, while under the German occupation, in the area was located the training centre of Abwehr, the military intelligence of Wehrmacht, and later also the military hospital, mainly for the soldiers inured at the Eastern Front. Following the end of the war, until October 1949, in the area was located Soviet prisoner-of-war camp. In 1949, it housed almost 300 prisoners-of-war.

In the 1970s, Piaski begun being developed as a residential neighborhood. Between 1970 and 1973, the apartment buildings were build around the Władysława Broniewskiego Street. The major development begun in 1978, with construction of the first apartment buildings around the Zegrzyńska Street. In the early 1980s, the architect Józef Zbigniew Polak had designed the apparent complex at the Sybiraków Avenue, to form the shape of four stars, the symbol of the general of the army of the Polish Armed Forces. It was done to honour general Wojciech Jaruzelski, who at the time was the Prime Minister of Poland and the commander-in-chief of the Polish Armed Forces.

In the 1980s, in Piaski was build an amphitheatre, which became a characteristic object of the neighbourhood. By 1990s, it become abandoned, and was eventually torn down, and replaced by Kaufland supermarket.

In 1990, in the area was placed the Police Training Centre.

Since 2019, at the crossing of Sybiraków Avenue and Piaskowska Street, is being build a nine-story apartment building, a first skyscraper in Piaski. It is planed to have 96 apartments. It replaced characteristic to the neighbourhood building known commonly as Okrąglak, which housed the branch of the PKO Bank Polski.

Citations

Notes

References 

Neighbourhoods of Białołęka
Populated places established in the 19th century